The 1995 WAFU Club Championship was the 18th  football club tournament season that took place for the runners-up or third place of each West African country's domestic league, the West African Club Championship. It was won again by Nigeria's Bendel Insurance after defeating Plateau United in two legs, it was the first final that feature both clubs from a single country.  A total of about around 35 goals were scored.

Preliminary round
Some results are unknown

|}

Quarterfinals

|}
Bendel Insurance directly headed to the finals

Semifinals

|}

Finals

|}

Winners

See also
1995 African Cup of Champions Clubs
1995 CAF Cup Winners' Cup
1995 CAF Cup

References

External links
Full results of the 1995 WAFU Club Championship at RSSSF

West African Club Championship
1995 in African football